Celianella is a genus of plants belonging to the family Phyllanthaceae first described in 1965. It has only one known species, Celianella montana, native to Guyana and to southern Venezuela (States of Amazonas + Bolívar). It is dioecious, with male and female flowers on separate plants.

References

Phyllanthaceae
Phyllanthaceae genera
Monotypic Malpighiales genera
Flora of South America
Dioecious plants